The Hotel Majestic is a historic luxury hotel located in Ho Chi Minh City, Vietnam. Built by local Chinese businessman Hui Bon Hoa in 1925 in a French Colonial and classical French Riviera styles. Bon Hoa was one of the richest business men in southern Vietnam at the time. 

The original design of the hotel had three stories and 44 bedrooms. In 1948, Mathieu Franchini, head of the Indochina Tourism & Exhibition Department bought the ground and first floors of the hotel and rented 44 rooms in the building for the next 30 years. The hotel was expanded in 1965; two more stories were added based on the design of Vietnamese architect Ngo Viet Thu.

It is located at 1 Dong Khoi Street, formerly rue Catinat. After 1975, the hotel name was changed to Mekong Hotel (Khách Sạn Cửu Long): 
and it became a government guest house. It was recently renamed again to the original name, the six storey building is now a 5 star hotel overlooking the Saigon River. It is owned by the state-owned Saigon Tourist.

Saigon Tourist announced a 1.9 trillion VND expansion project of the Majestic Hotel in July 2011. It plans to construct two towers of 24 and 27 storeys. The new complex will have a total 538 rooms, 353 of which will be hotel rooms.

Literature

See also
 Sofitel Legend Metropole Hanoi (1901), the largest heritage hotel from the French Indochina period

Other historic hotels in Ho Chi Minh City:
 Hotel Continental 1880
 Grand Hotel 1930
 Caravelle Hotel 1959
 Rex Hotel 1927

References

External links 

Hotel Majestic Homepage

Hotels in Ho Chi Minh City
Hotels established in 1925
Hotel buildings completed in 1925
1925 establishments in Vietnam
Hotel Majestic